This is a list of properties and districts in Richmond County, Georgia that are listed on the National Register of Historic Places (NRHP).

Augusta-Richmond was formed by merger of the independent city of Augusta, Georgia and Richmond County, Georgia.

Current listings

|}

References

Richmond
Richmond County